Men's 10 metre running target was one of the fifteen shooting events at the 1996 Summer Olympics. Yang Ling won, setting two new Olympic records.

Qualification round

OR Olympic record – Q Qualified for final

Final

OR Olympic record

References

Sources

Shooting at the 1996 Summer Olympics
Men's events at the 1996 Summer Olympics